Bauwens is a Belgian surname. Notable people with the surname include:

Lieven Bauwens (1769−1822), Belgian entrepreneur
Michel Bauwens (born 1958), Belgian Peer-to-Peer theorist, writer, researcher and conference speaker 
Peco Bauwens (1886−1963), German footballer
René Bauwens (1894−1959), Belgian freestyle swimmer and water polo player 
Ward Bauwens (born 1993), Belgian swimmer

See also
Bouwens, variant spelling of the surname, more common in the Netherlands

Dutch-language surnames
Patronymic surnames
Surnames of Belgian origin